Two at the Top is an album by saxophonist/flautist Frank Wess and flugelhornist Johnny Coles which was recorded and released on the Uptown label in 1983. The original album was rereleased on CD in 2012 along with one additional number and five alternate takes and a bonus live disc recorded in 1988.

Reception

The AllMusic review by Ken Dryden said "Two at the Top is one of the label's finest releases, a session pairing Frank Wess and the unjustly neglected Johnny Coles, accompanied by a potent rhythm section Highly recommended". On All About Jazz Marc Myers called it "a powerfully superb jazz album".

Track listing
Disc One:
 "Whistle Stop" (Kenny Dorham) – 6:03
 "Morning Star" (Rodgers Grant) – 5:38
 "Celia" (Bud Powell) – 5:04
 "Nica's Tempo" (Gigi Gryce) – 6:42
 "Minority" (Gryce) – 5:49
 "Ill Wind" (Harold Arlen, Ted Koehler) – 6:36
 "Stablemates" (Benny Golson) – 6:12
 "An Oscar for Oscar" (Dorham) – 4:21
 "A Blue Time" (Tadd Dameron) – 6:53 Additional track on CD release
 "An Oscar for Oscar" [Take One] (Dorham) – 4:21 Additional track on CD release
 "Stablemates" [Take One] (Golson) – 5:05 Additional track on CD release	
 "Minority" [Take One] (Gryce) – 5:10 Additional track on CD release
 "Whistle Stop" [Take One] (Dorham) – 4:40 Additional track on CD release
 "Morning Star" [Take One] (Grant) – 5:38 Additional track on CD release	
Disc Two: Live at Yoshi's 1988
 "One for Amos" (Sam Jones) – 14:37
 "If You Can't Call, Don't Come [aka Don't Come, Don't Call]" (Frank Wess) – 9:25
 "Morning Star" (Grant) – 9:03
 "Minority" (Gryce) – 12:09
 "Blues for David" (Charles "Buddy" Montgomery) – 15:03
Recorded at Yoshi's, Oakland, CA on January 15, 1988

Personnel
Frank Wess – alto saxophone, tenor saxophone, flute
Johnny Coles – flugelhorn
Kenny Barron (Disc One), Smith Dobson (Disc Two) – piano
Reggie Johnson (Disc One), Larry Grenadier (Disc Two) – double bass
Kenny Washington (Disc One), Donald 'Duck' Bailey (Disc Two) – drums
Don Sickler – arranger (Disc One)

References

Uptown Records (jazz) albums
Frank Wess albums
Johnny Coles albums
1983 albums
Albums recorded at Van Gelder Studio